The Road from Elephant Pass is a 2008 Sri Lankan war film directed, written and produced by Chandran Rutnam based on the novel of the same name by Nihal De Silva about the Sri Lankan Civil War. It stars Suranga Ranawaka and Ashan Dias in lead roles along with Sanath Gunathilake and Joe Abeywickrama. The film's music was composed by Ajit Kumarasiri. It is the 1131st film in Sri Lankan cinema.

It was a blockbuster in Sri Lankan film history. The film was dubbed into five Indian languages and screened in India, becoming the first Sri Lankan film to be screened in India.

Plot

A LTTE carder called "Kamala Velaithan" surrenders to the Sri Lanka Army and she was handed over to captain "Wasantha" in order to bring her to Colombo IBM headquarters. She has important inside information for the army which would lead to an attack on the LTTE leader. Her brother was killed by the LTTE for trying to desert it. When they started the journey their jeep was attacked by LTTE. So both of them escape from there and arrive in Periyumbutur by a boat. Then, due to the deadly attack faced before, his head is injured. So she wraps his head with a cloth and says not to speak anything. Both pass LTTE & ARMY points and continue the journey. Meanwhile, both fall love immensely with each other.

At last, he goes to hand over Kamala to IBM and there she reveals that the things she said about a big information is a lie and asks his pardon. Captain Wasantha was angry, but he couldn't say anything because Brigadier calls him to come with Kamala. Both goes and BGD asks the information from Wasantha. He says a date and a time which he pondered. However, SL air force attacked the place and a group of top LTTE leaders were killed. Meanwhile, Captain leaves to Elephant Pass(Alimankada) and it was attacked by LTTE and his mother receives a letter that Captain Wasantha is missing, while the operation was going on. His mother falls on a chair crying.

After several years, Kamala and Wasantha are smiling and playing with their child at a flat in Toronto, Canada.

Cast
 Suranga Ranawaka as Kamala Velaithan
 Ashan Dias as Captain Wasantha Ratnayake
 Athula Pathirana		
 Kumar Mirchandani		
 Priyantha Rambukenage
 Sanath Gunathilake as Major Kiriella
 Veena Jayakody as Kamala's Mother
 Iranganie Serasinghe as Wasantha's Mother
 Joe Abeywickrama as Tamil Shopkeeper
 Rohitha Mannage		
 Chula Weerasena		
 Ranjit Wickramsinghe

References

External links
 
 Alimankada –Behind the scenes
 Sri Lankan Film Alimankada – Clearing The Road From Elephant Pass
 Alimankada The road from elephant pass
 Film Alimankada: The road from elephant pass
 The Road from Elephant Pass...
 Alimankada – The Road from Elephant Pass at Sandeshaya Sri Lanka
 A journey of revelation, The Road for Elephant Pass
 The Road to Elephant Pass
 New York Festivals

2008 films
War films based on actual events
Films shot in Sri Lanka
Films about the Sri Lankan Civil War